Krobielowice  is a village in the administrative district of Gmina Kąty Wrocławskie, within Wrocław County, Lower Silesian Voivodeship, in south-western Poland.

The town was founded in 1321. As Krieblowitz in the Prussian Province of Silesia, it was one of the residences of renowned Field Marshal Gebhard Leberecht von Blücher, co-victor with Wellington over Napoleon at Waterloo, who died here in 1819. It was incorporated into the new German Empire in 1871. From 1937–45 under the Nazis Krieblowitz was renamed Blüchersruh ("Blücher's resting place"), partly to honour the Field Marshal, and partly because the authorities thought the original name sounded "too foreign".

The town remained part of Germany until the end of the Second World War. Blücher's mausoleum was vandalized by Soviet troops in 1945. The area was transferred to Poland later that same year. Blücher's empty tomb remains. 

In 1990s, the palace was renovated. It houses now a hotel and a restaurant. The area around the hotel was turned into a golf course.

References

Krobielowice